Boskop is a small village 16 km north of Potchefstroom. In 1913, the Boskop Man was found here, the first local anatomically modern human skull to be discovered. Consisting only of a post office and railway station on the route Potchefstroom-Welverdiend, the name is Afrikaans and means 'bush hill'.

See also
 Boskop Man

References

Populated places in the JB Marks Local Municipality